Alicia Hoskin (born 6 February 2000) is a New Zealand flatwater canoeist.

Early life 
Born and raised in Gisborne, she attended Gisborne Girls High School where she was the Head Girl (2018). A member of the Poverty Bay Kayak Club there, she was coached by 1984 Olympic sprint canoeist Liz Thompson. She attended Massey University studying Sport Development.

Canoeing 
Hoskin was selected for the junior canoe sprint world championships in 2017 when, as a 17-year-old, she underwent what was initially thought to be a routine pre-departure health check. Unfortunately, cardiology tests revealed Wolff-Parkinson-White Syndrome, which is present at birth and can cause rapid heartbeats and even heart failure. Hoskin required a cardiac ablation, a procedure that scars tissue in the heart to block abnormal electrical signals. It involved feeding a catheter up one of the veins in her leg and through the wall of her heart to the other side.

Hoskin wanted to continue to compete internationally after the heart surgery and moved to Auckland to train with the Canoe Racing New Zealand high performance squad. Hoskin made her World Championship debut in Szeged in Hungary, finishing ninth with Caitlin Ryan at the 2019 ICF Canoe Sprint World Championships – Women's K-2 500 metres.

In June 2021 Hoskin was one of four women's paddlers selected to the New Zealand team to compete in Tokyo for the delayed 2020 Summer Games, competing in the K2 500m and K4 500m.

Awards and honours 
Hoskin was named Canoe Sprint Athlete of the Year at the Canoe Racing New Zealand 2020 Sport and Recognition Awards.

References

External links 

 Alicia Hoskin at the Canoe Racing New Zealand
 Alicia Hoskin at the NZ Olympic Olympic Committee
 Alicia Hoskin at the International Canoe Federation

2000 births
Living people
New Zealand female canoeists
Sportspeople from Gisborne, New Zealand
Gisborne, New Zealand
People from Gisborne, New Zealand
Canoeists at the 2020 Summer Olympics
Olympic canoeists of New Zealand